The Voitinel (also: Pietroasa) is a right tributary of the river Suceava in Romania. It flows into the Suceava near Gălănești.

References

Rivers of Romania
Rivers of Suceava County